Markandeshwar Temple is a place where sage Markandeya meditated on lord Shiva. He saw a small child on a banyan leaf floating on the sea and wondered upon. Finally lord Vishnu assured him from the doubt.
The ancient Markandeswar Shiva Temple is situated in the Markandeswar street by the side of the Markandeswar tank, to the north of the Jagannath temple, Puri, Odisha, India. This place can be approached on the right side of Markandeswar road leading from Markandeswar chowk to Puri-Brahmagiri road. Markandeya tank is an open structure and it enclosed within a stone wall made of dressed laterite blocks. Bathing ghats are provided for the tourists in southern side of the tank. The tank is used for rituals as well as for normal bathing. Rituals like Pinda Dana, Mundan Kriya etc. are observed on the steps of the tank. Both Markandeswar temple and Markandeswar tank can be dated back to the 12th century AD. Puri became an important center of pilgrimage by the 12th century. The history in Puri also proves that Sri Ramanuja visited Puri during 1107 and 1117.

External links
more on Markandeshwar Temple

Hindu temples in Puri